Type 97 Service Dress were the military uniforms used by all branches of the People's Liberation Army (PLA) in both the People's Liberation Army Hong Kong Garrison and People's Liberation Army Macau Garrison beginning in 1997. These uniforms have since been replaced by the new Type 07 series of uniforms, which were unveiled in late June 2007 in conjunction with the 10th anniversary celebrations of the Transfer of sovereignty over Hong Kong.

The uniform was selected to give a more formal and clean image for military personnel in Hong Kong.

Service uniforms

Army uniforms

The Army variant of the Type 97 service uniform worn by the PLA Ground Force in Hong Kong and Macau featured an olive green colored jacket and blue tie. Olive green service caps and shirts were worn by officers. Formal dress pants continued to have yellow stripes. A lighter green shirt (with shoulder patch), berets and light olive green pants were worn by NCOs. Black boots are worn during formal ceremonies.

Navy Uniforms

The Type 97 Navy Uniforms had white and navy blue colors, but were still in line with the traditional appearance worn on the Mainland. NCO's wore white shirts with striped collar and blue pants. Black boots were worn during formal ceremonies.

Air Force Uniforms

The Type 97 Air Force Uniforms had white and blue colors, but were still in line with the traditional appearance worn on the Mainland. Black boots were worn during formal ceremonies.

Combat & Training Uniforms

Combat & Training Uniforms were the older Type 87 Combat & Training Uniforms originally introduced in the 1980s, but introduction of the Type 97 series began to add camouflage after 2000.

See also
Digital camouflage pattern uniforms:
CADPAT
Type 07
Type 87
MARPAT
Army Combat Uniform
Airman Battle Uniform

References

External links

Military uniforms
People's Liberation Army
Military equipment of the People's Republic of China